Bering Strait is the self-titled debut studio album by Russian country music band Bering Strait. It was released on January 14, 2003, via Universal South Records, now known as Show Dog-Universal Music.

Music videos were produced for "When Going Home", "Jagged Edge of a Broken Heart" and the 2002 Grammy Award nominee "Bearing Straight". Ultimately, "Bearing Straight" was aired on national television as a country music video, whereas "Jagged Edge" was aired on the Great American Country video music cable channel and distributed as a digital file on the CD album itself. "When Going Home" was never publicly distributed.

Track listing
"What Is It About You" (Brian Dean Maher, Billy Montana, Helen Darling) – 3:53
"Tell Me Tonight" (Ilya Toshinsky, Kevin Welch, Brent Maher) – 3:53
"I Could Be Persuaded" (Tony Marty, Brenton Roberts) – 2:50
"When Going Home" (George Teren, Stephanie Lewis) – 4:08
"I'm Not Missing You" (Maher, Jenai) – 4:26
"I Could Use a Hero" (Jenai, Montana) – 4:22
"The Trouble with Love" (Candy Parton, Mary Ann Kennedy, Pam Rose) – 3:44
"Jagged Edge of a Broken Heart" (Walker Ingleheart, Mike Joyce) – 3:58
"Only This Love" (Toshinsky, Mike Reid, Maher) – 3:33
"Bearing Straight" (instrumental) (Toshinsky, Lydia Salnikova, Sasha Ostrovsky, Sergei Passov) – 5:52
"Porushka-Paranya" (traditional) – 2:41
"Like a Child" (Live) (Bob DiPiero, Carolyn Dawn Johnson) – 3:46

Personnel
From Bering Strait liner notes.

Bering Strait
 Alexander Arzamastsev - drums, percussion
 Natasha Borzilova - lead vocals, acoustic guitar
 Sergey "Spooky" Olkhovsky - bass guitar
 Sergei Passov - mandolin, fiddle
 Lydia Salnikova - keyboards, background vocals, second lead vocals on "I Could Use a Hero" and "Porushka-Paranya"
 Sasha Ostrovsky - steel guitar, lap steel guitar, Dobro
 Ilya Toshinsky - electric guitar, acoustic guitar, banjo, background vocals

Additional musicians
Eddie Bayers - drum programming, percussion
Spencer Campbell - bass overdubs
Vince Gill - background vocals on "When Going Home"

Technical
 Tony Brown - producer ("When Going Home" only)
 Stan Cornelius - producer ("I Could Be Persuaded" and "Porushka-Paranya"), executive producer
 Ken Love - mastering
 Brent Maher - producer (all tracks), recording, mixing

Charts

References

2003 albums
Bering Strait (band) albums
Show Dog-Universal Music albums
Albums produced by Brent Maher
Albums produced by Tony Brown (record producer)